The 2019–20 season was the 44th season in Universitatea Craiova's history, and the 34th in the top-flight of Romanian football. Universitatea Craiova competed in Liga I, the Cupa României and the Europa League.

Players

First-team squad

Transfers

Out

Preseason and friendlies

<!-

Competitions

Overview

Liga I

The Liga I fixture list was announced in July 2019.

Regular season

Table

Results by round

Matches

Cupa României

Universitatea Craiova will enter the Cupa României at the Round of 32.

Round of 32

Round of 16

Quarter-finals

UEFA Europa League

As Universitatea Craiova finished 4th in the 2018–19 Liga I, they entered the Europa League at the first qualifying round.

First qualifying round
The draw for the first round took place on 18 June. Universitatea Craiova was drawn to play against Azerbaijan 3rd place Sabail.

Second qualifying round
Universitatea Craiova advanced to the second qualifying round. The draw for the second round took place on 19 June. Universitatea Craiova was drawn to play against Hungarian 4th place Honvéd.

Third qualifying round
Universitatea Craiova advanced to the third qualifying round. The draw for the third round took place on 22 July. Universitatea Craiova was drawn to play against Greek 3rd place AEK Athens.

Notes:
On 5 August 2019 UEFA banned Universitatea Craiova to attend two home games without fans following the incidents against Honved Budapest in the  Second qualifying round of Europa League.
In the match against AEK Athens only kids under 14 were allowed

Statistics

Squad appearances and goals
Last updated on 17 February 2020.

|-
! colspan="14" style="background:#dcdcdc; text-align:center"|Goalkeepers

|-
! colspan="14" style="background:#dcdcdc; text-align:center"|Defenders

|-
! colspan="14" style="background:#dcdcdc; text-align:center"|Midfielders

|-
! colspan="14" style="background:#dcdcdc; text-align:center"|Forwards

|-

|}

Squad statistics
{|class="wikitable" style="text-align: center;"
|-
! 
! style="width:70px;"|Liga I
! style="width:70px;"|Cupa României
! style="width:70px;"|Europa League
! style="width:70px;"|Home
! style="width:70px;"|Away
! style="width:70px;"|Total Stats
|-
|align=left|Games played       || 26 || 2 || 6 || 16 || 18 || 34 
|-
|align=left|Games won          || 14 || 2 || 2 || 10 || 8 || 18 
|-
|align=left|Games drawn        || 4 || 0 || 3 || 2 || 5 || 7 
|-
|align=left|Games lost         || 8 || 0 || 1 || 4 || 5 || 9 
|-
|align=left|Goals scored       || 41 || 5 || 7 || 27 || 26 || 53
|-
|align=left|Goals conceded     || 28 || 1 || 7 || 16 || 20 || 36 
|-
|align=left|Goal difference    || +13 || +4 || 0 || +11 || +6 || +17 
|-
|align=left|Clean sheets       || 5 || 1 || 2 || 4 || 4 || 8 
|-
|align=left|Goal by Substitute || 5 || 0 || 0 || 3 || 2 || 5 
|-
|align=left|Total shots        || 252 || 0 || 100 || 188 || 164 || 352
|-
|align=left|Shots on target    || 115 || 0 || 37 || 87 || 65 ||152
|-
|align=left|Corners            || 134 || 0 || 31 || 92 || 73 || 165
|-
|align=left|Players used       || 32 || 19 || 20 || 34 || 31 || 34
|-
|align=left|Offsides           || 48 || 0 || 20 || 39 || 29 || 68
|-
|align=left|Fouls suffered     || 433 || 0 || 90 || 269 || 254 || 523
|-
|align=left|Fouls committed    || 443 || 0 || 94 || 277 || 260 || 537
|-
|align=left|Yellow cards       || 70 || 1 || 13 || 35 || 49 || 84
|-
|align=left|Red cards          || 0 || 0 || 0 || 0 || 0 || 0 
|-
|align=left| Winning rate      || 56,00% || 100% || 33,33% || 66,6% || 41,17% || 54,54% 
|-

Notes:
Data unavailable for 2019–20 Cupa României matches against CSM Reşiţa and FC Voluntari in the round of Round of 32 respectively Round of 16.

Goals

Goal minutes

Last updated: 2020 (UTC) 
Source: Soccerway

Hat-tricks

Clean sheets

Disciplinary record
As of 17 February 2020

Attendances

See also

 2019–20 Cupa României
 2019–20 Liga I

References

CS Universitatea Craiova seasons
Universitatea, Craiova, CS